Transmembrane protein 221 (TMEM221) is a protein that in humans is encoded by the TMEM221 gene. The function of TMEM221 is currently not well understood.

Gene

General properties 
TMEM221 is also known as Putative Transmembrane Protein ENSP00000342162. The TMEM221 gene is 13,159 base pairs long, contains three exons, and is located on the short arm of chromosome 19 at 19p13.11 in humans. It spans from 17,435,509 to 17,448,668 on the minus strand. It is flanked by MVB12A upstream, and by AC010319.5 and NXNL1 downstream.

Promoter 
The predicted promoter region (GXP_1485843) is 2016 base pairs long and extends into the beginning of the second exon of TMEM221. The most abundant and highly predicted transcription factors to bind to the promoter are outlined in the table below.

Expression 

TMEM221 is highly expressed relative to other human genes in nearly every tissue type, suggesting it could potentially be a housekeeping gene. It is shown consistently to be most highly expressed in the brain, adrenal gland, and ovaries. Conditional expression demonstrates decreased expression of TMEM221 in ovarian cancer, lymphomas, and bone cancer.

mRNA 
The longest transcript of TMEM221 is 2,301 base pairs longs. It has one X1 isoform that is 1,547 base pairs long and contains one exon.

Transcript level regulation 
The mRNA structure of TMEM221 is predicted to have stem loop formation important for protein recognition and stability. There is one splice enhancer site with two DNAse hypersensitivity sites and bindings sites for transcription factors including CTCF, FOS, NFYB, and NFYA.

Protein

General properties 

The TMEM221 protein is 291 amino acids long and contains four transmembrane domains. The protein of the X1 variant is 232 amino acids long and contains one transmembrane domain. TMEM221 has a predicted molecular weight of 30 kDa and is slightly basic with a predicted isoelectric point of 8.6.

Composition 
TMEM221 has a significantly higher composition of leucine, alanine, and glycine as compared to other human proteins. It also has a significantly lower composition of asparagine and isoleucine. It has no high scoring charge clusters or charged segments.

Domains and Motifs 
TMEM221 has two conserved motifs, Jiraiya and DUF5408. The Jiraiya motif was found in all orthologs and composes the three latter transmembrane regions. Jiraiya is reported to be a factor in attenuation of bone morphogenetic protein (BMP) signaling. The DUF5408 motif is not yet characterized.

Structure 

TMEM221 protein is predicted to be composed of approximately 58% random coil, 20% alpha helix, and 22% extended strand. The tertiary structure is predicted to have three disulfide bridges between conserved cysteines that are in the non-cytoplasmic regions as well as one crossing between the non-cytoplasmic region and the second transmembrane region.

Subcellular location 
TMEM221 is predicted to be mostly localized to the endoplasmic reticulum, but also distributed throughout the mitochondria, vacuolar, plasma membrane, and extracellular space.

Signal peptide 
TMEM221 has a predicted signal peptide cleavage site between bases 24 and 25.

Post-translational modifications 

The only lipid modification TMEM221 has is one palmitoylation site, indicating that its trafficking may not be highly regulated. There is one predicted glycation site. There is one NES signal which is expected as the protein is expected to be located in the cytoplasm, among other locations. O-glycosylation is predicted at three sites that are likely important for protein stability and function. There are many possible phosphorylation sites, some with multiple possible kinases, that are likely important for protein activation. There is one SUMOylation site that would aid in nuclear-cytosolic transport.

Homology/evolution

Paralogs 
TMEM221 has one predicted paralog, hCG2038292. This protein is mostly highly conserved through the Jiraiya sequence. This diverged approximately 400 million years ago.

Orthologs 

TMEM221 is conserved throughout vertebrates but not in invertebrates, plants, or any other organisms. The most distant identified ortholog is the live shark sucker.

Rate of Evolution 

TMEM221 is a rapidly evolving gene with a rate of divergence faster than cytochrome C, a slowly evolving gene, and fibrinogen, a rapidly evolving gene.

Function/biochemistry

Interacting proteins 
TMEM221 has been shown to interact with GPR137C, TMEM211, OVOL3, TMEM132E, TMEM171, TMEM150C, GPR162, TMC5, and BAI2. These are all predicted to play an important role in taste cell function.

Clinical significance

Disease association 
A human disease known to be associated with TMEM221 is amoebiasis, a digestive infection caused by the amoeba Entamoeba histolytica. The gene is also shown to be less expressed in a multitude of cancers including ovarian cancer, lymphoma, and bone cancer among others.

Mutations 
There were many potential sites for SNPs in the coding sequence of TMEM221. Notably, W110 has five potential SNPs in its second and third codon positions. There are many other SNPs identified in other conserved amino acids, but these resulted in silent mutations.

References